The Frankfurt Christmas Market (German: Frankfurter Weihnachtsmarkt) is an annual outdoor Christmas market in central Frankfurt, Hesse, Germany.

The Christmas market opens in late November and continues until just before Christmas (normally 22 December) during Advent. It occupies a large area in central Frankfurt, including Friedrich-Stoltze-Platz, Hauptwache (to the north), Mainkai, Paulsplatz, and Römerberg (to the south).

The market is one of the oldest such "Weihnachtsmärkte" in Germany. Its origins date back to 1393.

There are a number of affiliated markets, including in Birmingham, England.

See also
 List of Christmas markets

References

Christmas markets in Germany
1393 establishments in Europe
Culture in Frankfurt
Economy of Frankfurt